Obereopsis sumatrensis is a species of beetle in the family Cerambycidae. It was described by Stephan von Breuning in 1951.

Subspecies
 Obereopsis sumatrensis madrasensis Breuning, 1957
 Obereopsis sumatrensis sumatrensis Breuning, 1951

References

sumatrensis
Beetles described in 1951